Loyola College of Social Sciences is a government aided Catholic higher education institution run by the Kerala Province of the Society of Jesus in Thiruvananthapuram, Kerala, India. It was founded by the Jesuits in 1963. It is affiliated with the University of Kerala and prepares students for a PhD in sociology, social work, and management studies.

The college celebrated its golden jubilee in 2012 with the President of India Pranab Mukherjee as guest of honor.

Milestones
 1993 – Government of India selects LES for field training under UBSP programme
 1996 – Government of India recognizes LES as regional Centre for Urban Poverty Eradication Program
 2007 – re-accredited by NAAC with A Grade, with CGPA of 3.7/4

See also
 List of Jesuit sites

References  

Colleges in Thiruvananthapuram
Jesuit universities and colleges in India
Educational institutions established in 1963
Jesuit development centres
Arts and Science colleges in Kerala
Colleges affiliated to the University of Kerala
1963 establishments in Kerala